The 1931 FA Charity Shield was the 18th FA Charity Shield, a football match between the winners of the previous season's First Division and FA Cup competitions. The match was contested by league champions Arsenal and FA Cup winners West Bromwich Albion, and was played at Villa Park, the home ground of Aston Villa. Arsenal won the game, 1–0.

Match

Details

References

FA Community Shield
Charity Shield 1931
Charity Shield 1931
Comm